Tha Mai is a tambon (subdistrict) of Tha Mai District, in Chanthaburi Province, Thailand. In 2017 it had a total population of 8,137 people.

Administration

Central administration
The tambon has no administrative villages (muban).

Local administration
The whole area of the subdistrict is covered by the town (Thesaban Mueang) Tha Mai (เทศบาลเมืองท่าใหม่).

References

External links
Thaitambon.com on Tha Mai

Tambon of Chanthaburi Province